Slovakia has participated in international football as an independent nation ever since 1993 when Czechoslovakia was divided into two new states. Slovakia qualified to the World Cup for the first time in 2010, where the side upset perennial power Italy and lost in the Round of 16. Since independence, they qualified for the UEFA European Championship for their first time in 2016. Football is the most popular sport in the Slovak Republic.

Football Association
The Slovak Football Association was a member of FIFA from April 1939 to 1945 and resumed in 1994.

Domestic football

The Slovak club's football tournament is held every season in the so-called Fortuna liga. It is the highest division and is sponsored by Fortuna. The first Slovak football league was formed in its current form in 1993, when the common league was discontinued after the end of the federation with the Czech Republic. In 2007-08 it averaged at about 3000 spectators per game. However, it has to be taken into consideration that Slovakia only has 5.5 million inhabitants. The clubs sell their players to financially stronger clubs from western Europe. Examples of players that have succeeded in notable leagues are Marek Hamšík, who is captain of Italian club SSC Napoli, Peter Pekarík who captains Bundesliga side Hertha BSC or Martin Škrtel, a well-known former Liverpool centre-back currently playing for Fenerbahçe. Moreover, over the last few years more and more youngsters have been given chances to perform regularly in the league and as the result, many transfers were to be seen. For example Leon Bailey, Milan Škriniar, Stanislav Lobotka or Samuel Kalu could have been seen playing football at Slovak stadiums recently.

The record champion is ŠK Slovan Bratislava with eight titles. Second comes MŠK Žilina with 7 titles.

The second-tier football league in Slovakia is called 2. Liga and 16 teams compete in it. The third tier league (known as 3. Liga) consists of four divisions of which three (division East, division Middle & division Bratislava) are of 16 teams and the other one (division West) consists of 18 teams.

In 2010, MŠK Žilina became the third Slovak club to participate in the Champions League, where they were eliminated in the group stage.

Slovak cup

Slovak Cup is the football cup competition for Slovak club teams. It is organized annually by the Slovak Football Federation (Slovenský futbalový zväz, SFZ).
The cup is held since the 1969/70 season, the first winner was the team of Slovan Bratislava.
Record winner is Slovan Bratislava with a total of 12 cup victories.

National team
The men's national team has recently been on the move and was able to qualify as a group winner for the 2010 World Cup in South Africa. After the Slovak team surprisingly won against the world champions Italy 3–2, the Slovaks also qualified for the knockout stages, where they were eliminated after a 2–1 defeat against the eventual finalists Netherlands.

See also
Sport in Slovakia
Slovak football league system
List of football stadiums in Slovakia

References

External links 
slovakia leagues summary(flashscore)

 

lt:Slovakijos futbolo sistema